The World Junior Alpine Skiing Championships 2007 were the 26th World Junior Alpine Skiing Championships, held between 6–11 March 2007 in Altenmarkt im Pongau and Flachau, Austria.

Medal winners

Men's events

Women's events

External links
World Junior Alpine Skiing Championships 2007 results at fis-ski.com

World Junior Alpine Skiing Championships
2007 in alpine skiing
Alpine skiing competitions in Austria
2007 in Austrian sport